The Ramos National Park lies in the island of Félicité in the Seychelles archipelago of the western Indian Ocean.

Description 

Ramos National Park covers two-thirds of Félicité island which is part of the Seychelles' Marine Protected Area (MPA). It is managed by Seychelles National Parks Authority since 1983, the Park's name is related to Ramos Mediterraneo.

See also 
 List of national parks of Seychelles

References

National parks of Seychelles
Important Bird Areas of Seychelles